Football Club Cessange Bracarenses Grund 2001 is a football club, based in Cessange, in southern Luxembourg founded in 2001 after a merger between Progrès Cessange and Bracarenses Grund.

References

External links 
 

Football clubs in Luxembourg
2001 establishments in Luxembourg